At the 1980 Summer Olympics in Moscow, four diving events were contested during a competition that took place at the Olimpiysky Sports Complex Swimming Pool, from 20 to 28 July (24 July, rest day), comprising 67 divers from 21 nations.

Medal summary
The events are named according to the International Olympic Committee labelling, but they appeared on the official report as "springboard diving" and "platform diving", respectively.

Men

Women

Medal table

Participating nations
Here are listed the nations that were represented in the diving events and, in brackets, the number of national competitors.

See also
 Diving at the 1979 Pan American Games

Notes

References
 
 

 
1980
1980 Summer Olympics events
1980 in water sports
Diving in the Soviet Union